The Reformed Presbyterian Church in North East India (RPCNEI) was established in 1835 by American missionaries like Rev. James R. Campbell. He started work in Saharanpur. In 1907, Rev. Watkins R. Robert wentto Mizoram. It was officially organised in 1979 with seven households, the first denomination of the Reformed Presbyterian Church in North East India. It had 4,200 members and 50 congregations in 2004. It now has 14,038 members and more than 107 congregations in North East India in Manipur, Assam, Mizoram, Tripura, Meghalaya. There is a growing church planting ministry in Myanmar.

The RPCNEI does not ordain women. It accepts the Westminster Confession of Faith, the Westminster Shorter Catechism and Westminster Larger Catechism.

It is a member of the World Communion of Reformed Churches and the International Conference of Reformed Churches.
The RPCNEI is a founding member of the Reformed and Presbyterian Fellowship and a member of the Evangelical Fellowship in India. The headquarters is located at Churachandpur in Manipur.

References

External links
Official website

1835 establishments in British India
Presbyterian denominations in Asia
Presbyterianism in India
Members of the World Communion of Reformed Churches
Evangelical denominations in Asia